On the Move is a German film directed by Adolf Winkelmann. It was released in 1978.

External links
 

1978 films
West German films
1970s German-language films
German road movies
1970s road movies
1970s German films